These are the official results of the Men's 800 metres event at the 2003 IAAF World Championships in Paris, France. There were a total number of 58 participating athletes, with eight qualifying heats, three semi-finals and the final held on Sunday 31 August 2003 at 17:30h.

Medalists

Final

Semi-final
Held on Friday 29 August 2003

Heats
Held on Thursday 28 August 2003

See also
Athletics at the 2003 Pan American Games - Men's 800 metres

References
 

H
800 metres at the World Athletics Championships